Islam in Delaware is an established religion. Although it is unknown how many Muslims live in the state, Delaware has at least five mosques and a sizable Muslim population.

The community itself lays claims to a Muslim origin dating back to Colonial times.

It is possible that the history of Islam in Delaware extends as far back as the origin of the Delaware Moors, a mixed-race community in Kent and Sussex counties whose origins are variously attributed to 18th century shipwrecked Moorish pirates, wives brought over from the 17th century British evacuation of Tangier, or a legendary romance between a European colonist and an enslaved Moorish prince.

Mosques, schools, community centers and organizations 

The Islamic Society of Delaware in Newark has the largest Muslim community following in the state. Communal prayers are held, providing an opportunity to learn about Islam, pray in congregation and meet Muslims. 
The First State Islamic Foundation is an umbrella organization of five distinct projects, i.e., Masjid Isa Ibn-e-Maryam, Tarbiyah School, Weekend Islamic School, After School Quran Program and a full-time Hifz school. The Islamic Center is located at 698 Old Baltimore Pike in Newark, DE.

Schools
The Tarbiyah Islamic School of Delaware is a registered pre-K-to-grade-12 school with the Delaware Department of Education since October 2010 and is recognized as a non-profit organization. Tarbiyah School is known for the quality of its curriculum, which integrates Islamic educational concepts with Delaware’s core standards for curriculum design. A focus on hands-on, real-life, practical activities and games supports the learning process and reinforces core concepts. Tarbiyah School offers services such as a day-care center. The school has an enrollment of about 225 students and has 35 employees.
The Islamic Academy of Delaware opened in September 2011. It is registered with the State of Delaware as a pre-kindergarten-to-grade-12 school. In 2012, its enrollment was about 150 students.

Masjids
Masjid al Kauthar, is a masjid located in Wilmington and is the oldest mosque in Delaware. 
Masjid Ibrahim (Islamic Society of Delaware, www.isdonline.org) in Newark is the largest mosque in Delaware. ISD offers 5 daily congregational prayers, Friday (Juma) prayers (2 sessions with sermons in English), special Eid prayers and special Taraweeh prayers every weeknight in Ramadan. ISD hosts weeknight halaqas (lectures) on Tuesdays, Wednesdays and Saturdays and a Living Islam program for new Muslims and those interested in Islam on Saturdays from 12 noon-1. ISD also conducts Islamic education programs for children - Quranic Academy of Delaware (QAD) on Saturdays and a Sunday School. The full-time Islamic Academy of Delaware (IAD) is co-located on the ISD campus at 28 Salem Church Road, Newark, DE 19713.
Masjid Isa Ibn-e-Maryam (First State Islamic Foundation) is located in Newark, and offers daily prayers, Friday prayers and Eid prayers. It is co-located with Tarbiyah School under the umbrella of First State Islamic Foundation. Daily Halaqas, new Muslim classes and other services are offered. Halaqa's are available at www.Tarbia.TV
The Elkton Masjid, on the second floor at 107 North Bridge Street, offers prayers five times daily in addition to jumu'ah salat (Friday prayers).
The Glasgow Mosque is located at 2555 Glasgow Avenue in Newark, five daily prayers are held and a khutbah on Fridays offered in congregation.
Masjid Ar Razzaqq is located at the intersection of 7th and Jackson Streets, this masjid has five daily prayers and a khutbah on Fridays.
Delaware Turkish Mosque located at 249 Appleby Rd, New Castle, DE 19720 - diyanetmosque.org
Muhammad Mosque 35 located at 2800 Washington St, Wilmington, DE 19802
Masjid Baitul Aman located at 2219 Naamans Rd, Wilmington, DE 19810 - masjidbaitulaman.com

Organizations
Masjid Al-Kauthar (aka Muslim Center of Wilmington) is the first established Muslim organization in  Delaware established in 1957. 
Tarbiyah School is the largest Islamic School in Delaware in terms of student enrollment, the facility and faculty.
Masjid Isa Ibn-e-Maryam is of the 12 major mosques in the area.
First State Islamic Foundation
Islamic Society of Delaware is of the 12 major mosques in the Delaware. 
University of Delaware Muslim Students Association is a resident-student organization at the University of Delaware.
Tarbia.TV
Delaware Council on Global and Muslim Affairs
Islamic Academy of Delaware

Community centers
 ICNA Relief Center of DE is an international relief organization. Its DE office provides relief services to the local homeless and needy. They also offer free tutoring classes and adult classes.
Zakat Community Center of Delaware is a social service center for the Delaware area.  Parent organization: Zakat Foundation of America: Offers free tutoring, ESL classes and distributes food once a month in Wilmington.  In process of opening a food pantry. Address: 21 Prestbury Square Newark, DE 19713

Community outreach and interfaith dialogue
There is a community of converted Muslims; an article in The News Journal by Summer Harlow in September 2007 highlights the transition many are making.

References 

 
Religion in Delaware